is a public university at Kahoku, Ishikawa, Japan, established in 2000.

External links
 Official website

Educational institutions established in 2000
Public universities in Japan
Universities and colleges in Ishikawa Prefecture
Nursing schools in Japan
2000 establishments in Japan
Kahoku, Ishikawa